The Billboard Hot 100 is the music industry standard record chart in the United States for songs, published weekly by Billboard magazine. Chart rankings are based on sales (physical and digital), radio play, and online streaming in the United States.

The weekly tracking period for sales was initially Monday to Sunday when Nielsen started tracking sales in 1991, but was changed to Friday to Thursday in July 2015. This tracking period also applies to compiling online streaming data. Radio airplay, which, unlike sales figures and streaming, is readily available on a real-time basis, is also tracked on a Friday to Thursday cycle effective with the chart dated July 17, 2021 (previously Monday to Sunday and before July 2015, Wednesday to Tuesday). A new chart is compiled and released on line to the public by Billboard website on Tuesdays but post-dated to the following Saturday when the printed magazine first reaches newsstands.

The first number-one song of the Billboard Hot 100 was "Poor Little Fool" by Ricky Nelson, on August 4, 1958. As of the issue for the week ending on March 18, 2023, the Billboard Hot 100 has had 1,147 different number-one entries. The chart's current number-one song is "Last Night" by Morgan Wallen.

History 

The first chart published by Billboard was "Last Week's Ten Best Sellers Among the Popular Songs", a list of best-selling sheet music, in July 1913. Other charts listed popular song performances in theatres and recitals. In 1928, "Popular Numbers Featured by Famous Singers and Leaders" appeared, which added radio performances to in-person performances. On January 4, 1936, Billboard magazine published "Ten Best Records for Week Ending", which recorded the 10 top selling records of three leading record companies as reported by the companies themselves. In October 1938, a review list "The Week's Best Records" was retitled "The Billboard Record Buying Guide" by incorporating airplay and sheet music sales, which would eventually become the first trade survey of record popularity. This, the full-page "Billboard Music Popularity Chart" for week ending July 20, 1940, and published in the July 27 issue, with lists covering jukebox play, retail sales, sheet music sales, and radio play. Listed were 10 songs of the National "Best Selling Retail Records", which is the fore-runner of today's pop chart, with "I'll Never Smile Again" by Tommy Dorsey its first number one.

Starting on March 24, 1945, Billboards lead popularity chart was the Honor Roll of Hits. This chart ranked the most popular songs regardless of performer (it combined different versions of the same song by different artists) based on record and sheet sales, disk jockey, and jukebox performances as determined by Billboards weekly nationwide survey. At the start of the rock era in 1955, there were three charts that measured songs by individual metrics:

 Best Sellers in Stores was the best seller chart first established in July 1940. This chart ranked the biggest selling singles in retail stores, as reported by merchants surveyed throughout the country (20 to 50 positions).
 Most Played by Jockeys was Billboards original airplay chart. It ranked the most played songs on United States radio stations, as reported by radio DJs and radio stations (20 to 25 positions).
 Most Played in Jukeboxes ranked the most played songs in jukeboxes across the United States (20 positions). This was one of the main outlets of measuring song popularity with the younger generation of music listeners, as many radio stations resisted adding rock and roll music to their playlists for many years.

Although officially all three charts had equal "weight" in terms of their importance, Billboard retrospectively considers the Best Sellers in Stores chart when referencing a song's performance before the creation of the Hot 100. On the week ending November 12, 1955, Billboard published The Top 100 for the first time. The Top 100 combined all aspects of a single's performance (sales, airplay and jukebox activity), based on a point system that typically gave sales (purchases) more weight than radio airplay. The first No. 1 in that chart was "Love Is a Many-Splendored Thing" by The Four Aces. The Best Sellers in Stores, Most Played by Jockeys and Most Played in Jukeboxes charts continued to be published concurrently with the new Top 100 chart.

On June 17, 1957, Billboard discontinued the Most Played in Jukeboxes chart, as the popularity of jukeboxes waned and radio stations incorporated more and more rock-oriented music into their playlists. The week of July 28, 1958, had the final Most Played by Jockeys and Top 100 charts, both of which had Perez Prado's instrumental version of "Patricia" ascending to the top.

On August 4, 1958, Billboard premiered one main all-genre singles chart: the Hot 100, with "Poor Little Fool" by Ricky Nelson its first No. 1. The Hot 100 quickly became the industry standard and Billboard discontinued the Best Sellers In Stores chart on October 13, 1958.

The Hot 100 was created by journalists Tom Noonan, Paul Ackerman, and Seymour Stein; Stein does not recall who chose the name.

The Billboard Hot 100 is still the standard by which a song's popularity is measured in the United States. The Hot 100 is ranked by radio airplay audience impressions as measured by Nielsen BDS, sales data compiled by Nielsen Soundscan (both at retail and digitally) and streaming activity provided by online music sources.

There are several component charts that contribute to the overall calculation of the Hot 100. The most significant ones are:

 Radio Songs: (per Billboard) approximately 1,000 stations, "composed of adult contemporary, R&B, hip hop, country, rock, gospel, Latin and Christian formats, digitally monitored twenty-four hours a day, seven days a week. Charts are ranked by number of gross audience impressions, computed by cross-referencing exact times of radio airplay with Arbitron listener data."
 Hot Singles Sales: (per Billboard) "the top selling singles compiled from a national sample of retail store, mass merchant and internet sales reports collected, compiled, and provided by Nielsen SoundScan." The chart is released weekly and measures sales of physical commercial singles. With the decline in sales of physical singles in the US, many songs that become number one on this chart often do not even chart on the Hot 100.
 Digital Songs: Digital sales are tracked by Nielsen SoundScan and are included as part of a title's sales points.
 Streaming Songs: a collaboration between Billboard, Nielsen SoundScan and National Association of Recording Merchandisers which measures the top streamed radio songs, on-demand songs and videos on leading online music services.

Compilation 

The tracking week for sales, streaming and airplay begins on Friday and ends on Thursday (airplay used to have a tracking week from Monday to Sunday, but effective with the chart dated July 17, 2021, the week was adjusted to align with the other two metrics). A new chart is compiled and officially released to the public by Billboard on Tuesday. Each chart is post-dated with the "week-ending" issue date four days after the charts are refreshed online (i.e., the following Saturday). For example:

 Friday, January 1 – tracking-week begins for sales, streaming and airplay
 Thursday, January 7 – tracking-week ends for sales, streaming and airplay
 Tuesday, January 12 – new chart released, with issue post-dated Saturday, January 16

Policy changes 

The methods and policies by which this data is obtained and compiled have changed many times throughout the chart's history.

Although the advent of a singles music chart spawned chart historians and chart-watchers and greatly affected pop culture and produced countless bits of trivia, the main purpose of the Hot 100 is to aid those within the music industry: to reflect the popularity of the "product" (the singles, the albums, etc.) and to track the trends of the buying public. Billboard has (many times) changed its methodology and policies to give the most precise and accurate reflection of what is popular. A very basic example of this would be the ratio given to sales and airplay. During the Hot 100's early history, singles were the leading way by which people bought music. At times, when singles sales were robust, more weight was given to a song's retail points than to its radio airplay.

As the decades passed, the recording industry concentrated more on album sales than singles sales. Musicians eventually expressed their creative output in the form of full-length albums rather than singles, and by the 1990s many record companies stopped releasing singles altogether (see Album Cuts, below). Eventually, a song's airplay points were weighted more so than its sales. Billboard has adjusted the sales/airplay ratio many times to more accurately reflect the true popularity of songs.

Double-sided singles 

Billboard has also changed its Hot 100 policy regarding "two-sided singles" several times. The pre-Hot 100 chart "Best Sellers in Stores" listed popular A- and-B-sides together, with the side that was played most often (based on its other charts) listed first. One of the most notable of these, but far from the only one, was Elvis Presley's "Don't Be Cruel" / "Hound Dog". During the Presley single's chart run, top billing was switched back and forth between the two sides several times. But on the concurrent "Most Played in Juke Boxes", "Most Played by Jockeys" and the "Top 100", the two songs were listed separately, as was true of all songs. With the initiation of the Hot 100 in 1958, A- and-B-sides charted separately, as they had on the former Top 100.

Starting with the Hot 100 chart for the week ending November 29, 1969, this rule was altered; if both sides received significant airplay, they were listed together. This started to become a moot point by 1972, as most major record labels solidified a trend they had started in the 1960s by putting the same song on both sides of the singles provided to radio.

More complex issues began to arise as the typical A-and-B-side format of singles gave way to 12 inch singles and maxi-singles, many of which contained more than one B-side. Further problems arose when, in several cases, a B-side would eventually overtake the A-side in popularity, thus prompting record labels to release a new single, featuring the former B-side as the A-side, along with a "new" B-side.

The inclusion of album cuts on the Hot 100 put the double-sided hit issues to rest permanently.

Album cuts 

As many Hot 100 chart policies have been modified over the years, one rule always remained constant: songs were not eligible to enter the Hot 100 unless they were available to purchase as a single. However, on December 5, 1998, the Hot 100 changed from being a "singles" chart to a "songs" chart. During the 1990s, a growing trend in the music industry was to promote songs to radio without ever releasing them as singles. It was claimed by major record labels that singles were cannibalizing album sales, so they were slowly phased out. During this period, accusations began to fly of chart manipulation as labels would hold off on releasing a single until airplay was at its absolute peak, thus prompting a top ten or, in some cases, a number-one debut. In many cases, a label would delete a single from its catalog after only one week, thus allowing the song to enter the Hot 100, make a high debut and then slowly decline in position as the one-time production of the retail single sold out.

It was during this period that several popular mainstream hits never charted on the Hot 100, or charted well after their airplay had declined. During the period that they were not released as singles, the songs were not eligible to chart. Many of these songs dominated the Hot 100 Airplay chart for extended periods of time:

 1995 The Rembrandts: "I'll Be There for You" (number one for eight weeks)
 1996 No Doubt: "Don't Speak" (number one for 16 weeks)
 1997 Sugar Ray featuring Super Cat: "Fly" (number one for six weeks)
 1997 Will Smith: "Men in Black" (number one for four weeks)
 1997 The Cardigans: "Lovefool" (number two for eight weeks)
 1998 Natalie Imbruglia: "Torn" (number one for 11 weeks)
 1998 Goo Goo Dolls: "Iris" (number one for 18 weeks)

As debate and conflicts occurred more and more often, Billboard finally answered the requests of music industry artists and insiders by including airplay-only singles (or "album cuts") in the Hot 100.

EPs 

Extended play (EP) releases were listed by Billboard on the Hot 100 and in pre-Hot 100 charts (Top 100) until the mid-to-late 1960s. With the growing popularity of albums, it was decided to move EPs (which typically contain four to six tracks) from the Hot 100 to the Billboard 200, where they are included to this day.

Digital downloads, online streaming and bundles 

Since February 12, 2005, the Billboard Hot 100 tracks paid digital downloads from such internet services as iTunes, Musicmatch, and Rhapsody. Billboard initially started tracking downloads in 2003 with the Hot Digital Tracks chart. However, these downloads did not count towards the Hot 100 and that chart (as opposed to Hot Digital Songs) counted each version of a song separately (the chart still exists today along with Hot Digital Songs). This was the first major overhaul of the Hot 100's chart formula since December 1998.

The change in methodology has shaken up the chart considerably, with some songs debuting on the chart strictly with robust online sales and others making drastic leaps. In recent years, several songs have been able to achieve 80-to-90 position jumps in a single week as their digital components were made available at online music stores. Since 2006, the all-time record for the biggest single-week upward movement was broken nine times.

In the issue dated August 11, 2007, Billboard began incorporating weekly data from streaming media and on-demand services into the Hot 100. The first two major companies to provide their statistics to Nielsen BDS on a weekly basis were AOL Music and Yahoo! Music. On March 24, 2012, Billboard premiered its On-Demand Songs chart, and its data was incorporated into the equation that compiles the Hot 100. This was expanded to a broader Streaming Songs chart in January 2013, which ranks web radio streams from services such as Spotify, as well as on-demand audio titles. In February 2013, U.S. views for a song on YouTube were added to the Hot 100 formula. "Harlem Shake" was the first song to reach number one after the changes were made.

In July 2020, Billboard announced that they would no longer allow sales of physical/digital bundles to be reported as digital sales. This refers to songs being bought along with merchandise, either from an artists website or through another vendor. The magazine stated that this was a tactic generally used by certain artists to boost their chart positions. Instead, such physical releases are now only counted when they are shipped to the consumer, rendering the tactic "ineffectual".

Remixes 

A growing trend in the early first decade of the 21st century was to issue a song as a "remix" that was so drastically different in structure and lyrical content from its original version that it was essentially a whole new song. Under normal circumstances, airplay points from a song's album version, "radio" mix and/or dance music remix, etc. were all combined and factored into the song's performance on the Hot 100, as the structure, lyrics and melody remained intact. Criticisms began when songs were being completely re-recorded to the point that they no longer resembled the original recording. The first such example of this scenario is Jennifer Lopez's "I'm Real". Originally entering the Hot 100 in its album version, a "remix" was issued in the midst of its chart run that featured rapper Ja Rule. This new version proved to be far more popular than the album version and the track was propelled to number one.

To address this issue, Billboard now separates airplay points from a song's original version and its remix, if the remix is determined to be a "new song". Since administering this new chart rule, several songs have charted twice, normally credited as "Part 1" and "Part 2". The remix rule is still in place.

Recurrents 

Billboard, in an effort to allow the chart to remain as current as possible and to give representation to new and developing artists and tracks, has (since 1991) removed titles that have reached certain criteria regarding its current rank and number of weeks on the chart. Recurrent criteria have been modified several times and currently, a song is permanently moved to "recurrent status" if it has spent 20 weeks on the Hot 100 and fallen below position number 50. Additionally, descending songs are removed from the chart if ranking below number 25 after 52 weeks. Exceptions are made to re-releases and sudden resurgence in popularity of tracks that have taken a very long time to gain mainstream success. These rare cases are handled on a case-by-case basis and ultimately determined by Billboards chart managers and staff. Christmas songs have been a regular presence on the Hot 100 each December since the relaxation of recurrent rules, culminating in Mariah Carey's 1994 recording "All I Want for Christmas is You" reaching #1 on the chart in December 2019.

Adjustment of tracking week 

Billboard altered its tracking-week for sales, streaming and radio airplay in order to conform to a new Global Release Date, which now falls on Fridays in all major-market territories (United States product was formerly released on Tuesdays before June 2015). This modified tracking schedule took effect in the issue dated July 25, 2015.

Year-end charts 

Billboards "chart year" runs from the first week of December to the final week in November. This altered calendar allows for Billboard to calculate year-end charts and release them in time for its final print issue in the last week of December.

Before Nielsen SoundScan, year-end singles charts were calculated by an inverse-point system based solely on a song's performance on the Hot 100 (for example, a song would be given one point for a week spent at position 100, two points for a week spent at position 99 and so forth, up to 100 points for each week spent at number one). Other factors including the total weeks a song spent on the chart and at its peak position were calculated into its year-end total.

After Billboard began obtaining sales and airplay information from Nielsen SoundScan, the year-end charts are now calculated by a very straightforward cumulative total of yearlong sales, streaming, and airplay points. This gives a more accurate picture of any given year's most popular tracks, as the points accrued by one song during its week at number one in March might be less than those accrued by another song reaching number three in January. Songs at the peak of their popularity at the time of the November/December chart-year cutoff many times end up ranked on the following year's chart as well, as their cumulative points are split between the two chart-years, but often are ranked lower than they would have been had the peak occurred in a single year.

Use in media 

The Hot 100 served for many years as the data source for the weekly radio countdown show American Top 40. This relationship ended on November 30, 1991, as American Top 40 started using the airplay-only side of the Hot 100 (then called Top 40 Radio Monitor). The ongoing splintering of Top 40 radio in the early 1990s led stations to lean into specific formats, meaning that practically no station would play the wide array of genres that typically composed each weekly Hot 100 chart.

An artist or band's ability to have hits in the Hot 100 across multiple decades is recognized as a sign of longevity and being able to adapt to changing musical styles. Only five artists had a Hot 100 Top 40 hit in each of the four decades from the 1980s through the 2010s: Michael Jackson, Madonna, "Weird Al" Yankovic, U2, and Kenny G. Mariah Carey is the first artist to have a number-one single in four different decades.

Similar charts 

A new chart, the Pop 100, was created by Billboard in February 2005 to answer criticism that the Hot 100 at the time was too dominated by hip hop and R&B. It was discontinued in June 2009 due to the charts becoming increasingly similar.

The Canadian Hot 100 was launched June 16, 2007. Like the Hot 100 chart, it uses sales and airplay tracking compiled by Nielsen SoundScan and BDS.

The Billboard Japan Hot 100 was launched in the issue dated May 31, 2008, using the same methodologies as the Hot 100 charts for the U.S. and Canada, using sales and airplay data from SoundScan Japan and radio tracking service Plantech.

The Vietnamese edition of Hot 100, Billboard Vietnam Hot 100, was launched on January 14, 2022.

See also 

 American Top 40
 Bestseller
 Billboard charts
 Billboard Global 200
 Billboard Music Awards
 Chart-topper
 List of artists who reached number one in the United States
 List of best-selling music artists
 List of Billboard Hot 100 chart achievements and milestones
 List of Billboard Hot 100 number-one singles of the 2020s
 List of Billboard Hot 100 top-ten singles
 List of Billboard number-one singles
 Single certifications
 Rolling Stone Top 100

Notes

References 

 Bronson, Fred. Billboard Book of Number 1 Hits, 5th Edition
 Feldman, Christopher G. The Billboard Book of No. 2 Singles
 Whitburn, Joel. Top Pop Singles 1955–2008, 12 Edition
 Whitburn, Joel. The Billboard Pop Charts, 1955–1959
 Whitburn, Joel. The Billboard Hot 100 Charts: The Sixties
 Whitburn, Joel. The Billboard Hot 100 Charts: The Seventies
 Whitburn, Joel. The Billboard Hot 100 Charts: The Eighties
 Whitburn, Joel. The Billboard Hot 100 Charts: The Nineties

External links 

 

Hot 100
Top lists
 
1958 establishments in the United States